Pink and blue or Pink & Blue may refer to:

 "Pink and Blue", a 2013 song by Hannah Diamond
 Pink and Blue (Renoir), an 1881 painting of two girls
 Pink and blue ribbon, a symbol worn to promote awareness of various causes
 Pink & Blue, a 2008 album by Waterdeep
 "Pink & Blue", a song by Outkast from the 2003 album Speakerboxxx/The Love Below
 "Pink & Blue", a song by Tycho from the 2019 album Weather (Tycho album)
 Pink and Blue: Telling the Boys from the Girls in America

See also 
 Gendered associations of pink and blue, how pink and blue became associated with girls and boys
 List of historical sources for pink and blue as gender signifiers, a list page of references in timeline form
 "Pink Turns to Blue", a song by American rock band Hüsker Dü
 Blue and Not So Pink, a 2012 Venezuelan film
 Pink and Blue for Two, a charitable health awareness organization
 Pink (disambiguation)
 Blue (disambiguation)